The Brantly Sturdevant House, located at 308 S. Main St. in Atkinson, Nebraska, is a historic Queen Anne style house that was built in 1887, which is operated as Sturdevant-McKee Museum.  It has been designated NeHBS No. HT02-042.  It was listed on the National Register of Historic Places in 1999.  The listing included three contributing buildings.

Its NRHP nomination argued that it was historically significant for association with Brantly Sturdevant, who was born in Pennsylvania in 1852 and came to Nebraska with his parents and family in 1871.  He came to Atkinson in 1885.  The house was built in 1887 and remained in the Sturdevant family to 1977.

References

External links 
 Sturdevant-McKee Museum - official site

Houses on the National Register of Historic Places in Nebraska
Queen Anne architecture in Nebraska
Houses completed in 1887
Houses in Holt County, Nebraska
Museums in Holt County, Nebraska
Historic house museums in Nebraska
National Register of Historic Places in Holt County, Nebraska